HTLINGUAL (also HGLINGUAL), a secret project of the United States of America's Central Intelligence Agency (CIA) to intercept mail destined for the Soviet Union and China, operated from 1952 until 1973. Originally known under the codename SRPOINTER (also SGPOINTER), the project authority was changed in 1955 and renamed. Early on, the CIA collected only the names and addresses appearing on the exterior of mailed items, but they were later opened at CIA facilities in Los Angeles and in New York.

The program had the stated purpose of obtaining foreign intelligence, but it targeted domestic peace and  civil-rights activists as well. Mail to and from prominent individuals such as Bella Abzug, Bobby Fischer, Linus Pauling, John Steinbeck, Martin Luther King Jr., Edward Albee, and Hubert Humphrey was opened during the course of the operation. A total of 28 million letters were examined, and 215,000 were opened.

See also
 Cabinet noir

References

Further reading 
 Church Committee document: Exhibit 1: Inspector General's Survey of the Office of Security (Annex II) (PDF)
 Commission on CIA Activities Within the United States, June 6, 1975, Report from Rockefeller Commission to the President.
 Department of Justice 57 page Declination memo (date, c. 1976) to not prosecute those involved in the mail intercept operations of 1953–1973.

Central Intelligence Agency domestic surveillance operations
Central Intelligence Agency operations
Espionage scandals and incidents